A by-election was held for the New South Wales Legislative Assembly electorate of Goldfields North on 17 December 1868 because of the resignation of George Pickering.

Dates

Result

The by-election was caused by the resignation of George Pickering.

See also
Electoral results for the district of Goldfields North
List of New South Wales state by-elections

References

1868 elections in Australia
New South Wales state by-elections
1860s in New South Wales